Elaine Ives-Cameron (5 December 1938–15 November 2006) was an American-born British actress.

Elaine Ives-Cameron was born Elaine Schleifer, in Philadelphia, Pennsylvania. She had one son, Erik Cameron, and was grandmother to his two children Amelie, and Benjamin. Her brother, Dr Charles R. Schleifer, is a hospital physician in Philadelphia.

Her film credits include: The Night Digger, Terror, Murder by Decree and Supergirl.

Television appearances include: Codename; Doctor Who, The Stones of Blood serial in the Key to Time story arc; Tales of the Unexpected; Miss Marple, as Hannah (the cook) in A Murder is Announced; Dempsey and Makepeace and The Bill.

In 2001, she guest-starred in the Doctor Who audio adventure, The Stones of Venice.

In 1994, Elaine Ives-Cameron wrote an article for The Independent newspaper about difficulties in the reclaiming of her house in the U.K., which she had first let, and which was then occupied by squatters. The article provides a good example of the problems of eviction of squatters at that time, and looks forward to the publication of the Criminal Justice and Public Order Act 1994. The Act contains provisions for the eviction of squatters within twenty-four hours.

Filmography

References

External links
 

American emigrants to England
English television actresses
2006 deaths
1938 births